Ayoub Assal (born 21 January 2002) is an English professional footballer who plays as a midfielder for Qatar Stars League club for Al-Markhiya on loan from Al-Wakrah.

Career
Assal began his career in the youth system at Millwall, joining AFC Wimbledon at under-12 level. In April 2019, Assal signed his first professional contract with Wimbledon. In August 2019, Assal joined Metropolitan Police on loan. After returning to Wimbledon, he made his debut for the club on 13 November in a 3–1 EFL Trophy loss against Southend United. On 11 January 2020, Assal rejoined Metropolitan Police on loan until 25 April 2020.

In October 2020, Assal joined National League South side Billericay Town. He returned to Wimbledon after making one appearane during his loan, and made his league debut as a substitute against Shrewsbury Town on 2 March 2021, scoring a late equaliser in a 1–1 draw. On 10 April, Assal scored twice for AFC Wimbledon in a 5–1 win against Accrington Stanley, and in May he signed a new three-year contract with Wimbledon.

On 10 December 2022, Assal was awarded the EFL Young Player of the Month Award for November 2022 having scored in all five of Wimbledon's matches across all competitions. This was the second time he had received the award having also won in April 2021, only the second player, after Djed Spence, to win the award on two occasions.

On 18 January 2023, it was announced that the release clause in Assal's contract had been triggered by a bid from a club based in Qatar. On 27 January, Assal completed his transfer to Al-Wakrah, where he signed a five-year contract. The fee was a club record sale for the Dons. On 29 January, Assal joined Al-Markhiya on loan for the rest of the season.

International career
In March 2022, he was called up to the provisional England U20 squad, having previously attended a training camp with Morocco U20.

Career statistics

Honours
Individual
EFL Young Player of the Month: April 2021, November 2022

References

2002 births
Living people
Sportspeople from Maidstone
Footballers from Kent
Association football midfielders
English footballers
AFC Wimbledon players
Metropolitan Police F.C. players
Billericay Town F.C. players
Al-Wakrah SC players
Al-Markhiya SC players
Southern Football League players
National League (English football) players
English Football League players
English people of Moroccan descent

English expatriate footballers
Expatriate footballers in Qatar
English expatriate sportspeople in Qatar